"Change Your Life" is a song by American group Far East Movement from their fourth studio album Dirty Bass. It features American rapper and singer-songwriter Flo Rida and Dutch DJ Sidney Samson. The song was released in Belgium on October 26, 2012 as the album's fourth single. The song was written by Far East Movement, Flo Rida, Sidney Samson, Nathan Walker, Breyan Isaac, Antonio Mobley, and produced by Sidney Samson. Flo Rida's verse borrows lyrics from the 1989 Lisa Stansfield hit "All Around the World", which was written by Stansfield and producers Ian Devaney and Andy Morris. It peaked at number 91 in Germany.

Music video
A music video to accompany the release of "Change Your Life" was first released on YouTube on November 20, 2012.

Track listing

Credits and personnel
 Lead vocals – Far East Movement and Flo Rida
 Producer – Sidney Samson
 Music – Sidney Samson
 Lyrics – Jae Choung, James Roh, Kevin Nishimura, Virman Coquia, Nathan Walker, Tramar Dillard, Breyan Isaac, Antonio Clarence Mobley
 Writers (sampled) – Lisa Stansfield, Ian Devaney, Andy Morris
 Label: Interscope Records

Chart performance

Release history

References

2012 singles
2012 songs
Far East Movement songs
Flo Rida songs
Interscope Records singles
Songs written by Lisa Stansfield
Songs written by Ian Devaney
Songs written by Andy Morris (musician)
Songs written by Flo Rida
Songs written by Breyan Isaac
Songs written by Antonio Mobley